The 1986 Montreal Expos season was the 18th season in franchise history, finishing in 4th with a 78-83 record and 29 1/2 games behind the eventual World Series champion New York Mets.

Offseason
 October 24, 1985: Bill Laskey was traded by the Expos to the San Francisco Giants for George Riley and Alonzo Powell.
 November 7, 1985: Mel Rojas was signed by the Expos as an amateur free agent.
 November 8, 1985: Razor Shines was released by the Expos.
 December 11, 1985: Roy Johnson was drafted from the Expos by the Chicago White Sox in the 1985 minor league draft.
 December 16, 1985: Steve Baker was traded by the Expos to the Baltimore Orioles for Nelson Norman.
 December 19, 1985: Bill Gullickson and Sal Butera were traded by the Expos to the Cincinnati Reds for Jay Tibbs, Andy McGaffigan, John Stuper, and Dann Bilardello.
 December 27, 1985: Curt Brown was signed as a free agent by the Expos.
 January 13, 1986: Mike Fuentes was traded by the Expos to the Oakland Athletics for Tom Romano.
 February 25, 1986: Bob Owchinko was signed as a free agent with the Montreal Expos.
 March 26, 1986: Jack O'Connor was released by the Expos.
 March 31, 1986: Norm Charlton and a player to be named later were traded by the Expos to the Cincinnati Reds for Wayne Krenchicki. The Expos completed the deal by sending Tim Barker (minors) to the Reds on April 2.
 March 31, 1986: Fred Manrique was traded by the Expos to the St. Louis Cardinals for Tom Nieto.

Spring training
The Expos held spring training at West Palm Beach Municipal Stadium in West Palm Beach, Florida – a facility they shared with the Atlanta Braves. It was their 10th season at the stadium; they had conducted spring training there from 1969 to 1972 and since 1981.

Regular season
 July 6, 1986: In an 11-8 loss to the Expos, Bob Horner of the Atlanta Braves hit four home runs in one game. Horner became the second player in the 20th century (Gil Hodges was the first in 1950) to hit four home runs in one game in his home park. He became the first player since Ed Delahanty to hit four home runs in a losing game.

Season standings

Record vs. opponents

Opening Day starters
Hubie Brooks
Andre Dawson
Vance Law
Tom Nieto
Tim Raines
Jason Thompson
Jay Tibbs
Tim Wallach
Mitch Webster

Notable transactions
 April 1, 1986: Terry Francona was released by the Expos.
 April 5, 1986: Doug Frobel was traded by the Montreal Expos to the New York Mets for Joe Graves (minors) and Rodger Cole (minors).
 June 2, 1986: 1986 Major League Baseball draft
 Kent Bottenfield was drafted by the Montreal Expos in the 4th round. Player signed June 5, 1986.
 Mike Blowers was drafted by the Expos in the 10th round. Player signed June 13, 1986.
 June 10, 1986: Johnnie LeMaster was signed as a free agent with the Montreal Expos.
 June 16, 1986: The Expos traded a player to be named later to the Baltimore Orioles for Dennis Martínez and a player to be named later. The Orioles completed their part of the deal by sending John Stefero to the Expos on December 8. The Expos completed the deal by sending Rene Gonzales to the Orioles on December 16.
July 9, 1986: Johnnie LeMaster was released by the Montreal Expos.
 July 24, 1986: Dan Schatzeder and Skeeter Barnes were traded by the Expos to the Philadelphia Phillies for Tom Foley and Lary Sorensen.
 July 25, 1986: Razor Shines was signed as a free agent by the Expos.

Roster

Player stats

Batting

Starters by position 
Note: Pos = Position; G = Games played; AB = At bats; H = Hits; Avg. = Batting average; HR = Home runs; RBI = Runs batted in

Other batters 
Note: G = Games played; AB = At bats; H = Hits; Avg. = Batting average; HR = Home runs; RBI = Runs batted in

Pitching

Starting pitchers 
Note: G = Games pitched; IP = Innings pitched; W = Wins; L = Losses; ERA = Earned run average; SO = Strikeouts

Other pitchers 
Note: G = Games pitched; IP = Innings pitched; W = Wins; L = Losses; ERA = Earned run average; SO = Strikeouts

Relief pitchers 
Note: G = Games pitched; W = Wins; L = Losses; SV = Saves; ERA = Earned run average; SO = Strikeouts

Awards and honors

1986 Major League Baseball All-Star Game

Farm system 

LEAGUE CHAMPIONS: Indianapolis

References

 1986 Montreal Expos team at Baseball-Reference
 1986 Montreal Expos team at baseball-almanac.com

Montreal Expos seasons
Montreal Expos season
1980s in Montreal
1986 in Quebec